One Mind is a 2005 album by Charles Manson. It is composed entirely of songs, poems and speeches composed and performed by Manson himself in his jail cell at San Quentin, recorded on a portable tape recorder. It is the final original material to be performed by Charles Manson before his death on November 19, 2017.

The album was re-released in April 2008 as a free digital download under a Creative Commons license. The album was re-released again in June 2014 independently by Manson's non-profit organization ATWA.

Track listing
 "I Can See You" – 1:20
 "Angels Fear to Tread" – 2:40
 "Riding on Your Fears" – 5:05
 "I Don't Need Water Sprinklers in the Desert" – 6:47
 "Your Magic Motion" – 3:24
 "Whoever You Are" – 2:29
 "The Black Pirate" – 5:10
 "So We Go Again" – 6:10
 "Self Is Eternal (What Our World Will Be)" – 8:07
 "Sometimes It Works Just Right" – 1:43
 "Sweet Words" – 12:53
 "Interpretations" – 4:03
 "If You Have No One" – 5:20
 "I Keep on Wondering (Interrupted)" – 4:09
 "1967" / "Mac Brother" – 3:55
 "Venice, California" – 2:36

References

External links
Charles Manson - One Mind at Discogs
Release - One Mind at MusicBrainz

2005 albums
Albums free for download by copyright owner
Charles Manson albums
2000s spoken word albums
San Quentin State Prison
Prison music